God, the Universe and Everything Else is a 1988 documentary featuring Stephen Hawking, Arthur C. Clarke and Carl Sagan, and moderated by Magnus Magnusson. They discuss the Big Bang theory, God and the possibility of extraterrestrial life.

See also 
 Stephen Hawking in popular culture

External links 

 

Documentaries about science
Cultural depictions of Stephen Hawking
Carl Sagan
Arthur C. Clarke
1980s English-language films